Sirdaryo ( /) is a city in Sirdaryo Region of Uzbekistan. It serves as the administrative center of Sirdaryo District. Its population is 28,800 (2016).

References

Populated places in Sirdaryo Region
Cities in Uzbekistan